88 Postal and Courier Regiment, Royal Logistic Corps, was a regiment of the Territorial Army in the United Kingdom.

History
The regiment was originally formed as the 88th Postal and Courier Regiment, Royal Logistic Corps (Volunteers). Two squadrons were transferred to 87 Postal and Courier Regiment RLC in 2006. The regiment was absorbed into 162 Regiment RLC in 2013.

Structure
The final structure was as follows:
871 Squadron
872 Squadron
883 Squadron 
884 Squadron

External links
88th Postal and Courier Regiment

References

Regiments of the Royal Logistic Corps
Military units and formations established in 1993
Military mail
Postal history of the United Kingdom